is a horizontally scrolling shooter arcade video game released in 1981. It was developed by Konami and manufactured and distributed by Leijac in Japan and Stern in North America. It was the first side-scrolling shooter with forced scrolling and multiple distinct levels, and it established the foundation for a new genre.

It was Konami's first major worldwide hit. In the United States, it sold 15,136 arcade cabinets within five months and became Stern's second best-selling game. Scramble was not ported to any major contemporary consoles or computers, but there were releases for the Tomy Tutor and Vectrex as well as dedicated tabletop/handheld versions. Unauthorized clones for the VIC-20 and Commodore 64 used the same name as the original. Its sequel was the more difficult Super Cobra, released later that year. Gradius (1985) was originally intended to be a follow-up to Scramble.

Gameplay

The player controls a futuristic aircraft, referred to in the game as a jet, and has to guide it across a scrolling terrain, battling obstacles along the way. The jet is armed with a forward-firing weapon and bombs; each weapon has its own button. The player must avoid colliding with the terrain and other enemies, while simultaneously maintaining its limited fuel supply which diminishes over time. More fuel can be acquired by destroying fuel tanks in the game.

The game is divided into six sections, each with a different style of terrain and different obstacles. There is no intermission between each section; the game simply scrolls into the new terrain. Points are awarded based upon the number of seconds of being alive, and on destroying enemies and fuel tanks. In the final section, the player must destroy a "base". Once this has been accomplished, a flag denoting a completed mission is posted at the bottom right of the screen. The game then repeats by returning to the first section once more, with a slight increase in difficulty.

Scoring
 Per second the jet is in play: 10 points
 Rockets: 50 points on ground, 80 in air
 UFO ships: 100 points
 Fuel tanks: 150 points
 Mystery targets: 100, 200, or 300 points
 Base at ends of levels: 800 points

The player is awarded an extra jet for scoring 10,000 points, and none more thereafter. A jet is lost upon contact with anything. Once the final jet is destroyed, the game is over.

Handheld versions
A dedicated Tomytronic version of Scramble was released in 1982. A second electronic tabletop version of Scramble was released the same year in the UK by Grandstand under licence from Japanese firm Epoch Co., who sold the game in Japan under the title Astro Command. Gameplay differs from the arcade version as no scenery is rendered and the ship has no need to refuel. A handheld compact LCD version known as "Pocket Scramble" was released the following year. Scramble was also made available on the 2006 Game Boy Advance cartridge, "Konami Collector Series Arcade Advanced", this version is a very close port of the original game in the arcade cabinet.

Reception
Scramble was commercially successful and critically acclaimed. In its February 1982 issue, Computer and Video Games magazine said it "was the first arcade game to send you on a mission and quickly earned a big following". In the United States, the game topped the monthly RePlay arcade charts in June 1981. It sold 15,136 arcade cabinets in the United States within five months, by August 4, 1981, becoming Stern's second best-selling game after Berzerk. Its sequel, the more difficult Super Cobra, sold 12,337 cabinets in the U.S. in four months that same year, adding up to 27,473 U.S. cabinet sales for both, by October 1981. In Japan, Scramble was tied with Jump Bug and Space Panic as the 14th highest-grossing arcade video game of 1981.

The Vectrex version was reviewed in Video magazine where it was praised for its fidelity to the original arcade game and was described as the favorite among Vectrex titles they had reviewed. The game's overlays were singled out, with reviewers commenting that "when you're really involved with a Vectrex game like Scramble, it's almost possible to forget that the program is in black-and-white". David H. Ahl of Creative Computing Video & Arcade Games reported in 1983 that no test player was able to get past the fourth level of the Vectrex version.

In 1982, Arcade Express gave the Tomytronic version of the game a score of 9 out of 10, describing it as an "engrossing" game that "rates as one of the year's best so far".

Scramble made the list of Top 100 arcade games in the Guinness World Records Gamer's Edition. In 1996, GamesMaster ranked the arcade version 60th in their "Top 100 Games of All Time."

Legacy
According to the Nintendo Game Boy Advance Gradius Advance intro and the Gradius Breakdown DVD included with Gradius V, Scramble is considered the first in the Gradius series. However, the Gradius Collection guidebook issued a few years after by Konami, lists Scramble as part of their shooting history, and the Gradius games are now listed separately.

An updated version of Scramble is available in Konami Collector's Series: Arcade Advanced by inputting the Konami Code in the game's title screen. This version allows three different ships to be chosen: the Renegade, the Shori, and the Gunslinger. The only difference between the ships besides their appearance are the shots they fire. The Renegade's shots are the same as in the original Scramble, the Shori has rapid-fire capabilities triggered by holding down the fire button, and the Gunslinger's shots can pierce through enemies, meaning they can be used for multiple hits with a single shot.

Impact
In an interview with RePlay magazine in January 1990, Konami founder Kagemasa Kōzuki (Kaz Kozuki) stated that he considers Scramble to be Konami's most important game. He stated that Scramble was the company's first major hit that "launched Konami into world prominence." The game also served as a foundation for the side-scrolling shooter genre. While not the first side-scrolling shoot 'em up (it was predated by Defender two months earlier), Wayne Santos of GameAxis Unwired notes that Scramble and its sequel Super Cobra "created the side-scrolling shooter that progressed to the end of a level, rather than having a self-enclosed level that warped on itself in an infinite loop, like Defender."

Konami's Gradius (1985), the first title in the Gradius series, was originally intended to be a follow-up to Scramble, with the working title Scramble 2. It reused many of its materials and game mechanics. Game designer Scott Rogers named Scramble as well as Irem's Moon Patrol (1982) as forerunners of the endless runner platform genre.

In other media
Scramble gameplay is featured during the opening credits of the 1982 Spanish film Colegas by Eloy de la Iglesia, along with some other arcade games of the era like Defender, Monaco GP and Missile Command.

Re-releases
 Scramble joined the Xbox Live Arcade library for the Xbox 360 on September 13, 2006.
 Scramble was made available on Microsoft's Game Room service on March 24, 2010.
 Scramble was re-released in 2002 for GBA titled Konami Arcade Advanced.
 Scramble was re-released in 2005 for PlayStation 2 in Japan as part of the Oretachi Geasen Zoku Sono-series.
 Scramble was re-released in 2007 for Nintendo DS as part of Konami Classics Series: Arcade Hits.
 Scramble was re-released for PlayStation 4, Nintendo Switch, Xbox One, and PC on Steam on April 18, 2019 as part of the Konami Anniversary Collection Arcade Classics.

Clones
The Atari 8-bit family games Airstrike (1982) and Bellum (1983) are both Scramble clones. Skramble (1983) is a clone for the Commodore 64. Whirlybird Run (1983) is a TRS-80 Color Computer clone.

Legal history
In Stern Electronics, Inc. v. Kaufman, 669 F.2d 852, the Second Circuit held that Stern could copyright the images and sounds in the game, not just the source code that produced them.

See also
Cosmic Avenger (1981)
Harrier Attack (1984)
Vanguard (1981)

References

External links
Official Arcade Archives website

Scramble at the Arcade History database

1981 video games
Arcade video games
Gradius video games
Konami franchises
Konami games
Horizontally scrolling shooters
Nintendo Switch games
PlayStation 4 games
Stern video games
Vectrex games
Xbox 360 Live Arcade games
Konami arcade games
Video games developed in Japan
Multiplayer and single-player video games
Hamster Corporation games